Politics and Excellence: The Political Philosophy of Alfarabi is a 1990 book by the philosopher Miriam Galston. The book was awarded the Farabi Award.

Content
The author develops a theory accounting how Farabi's major political treatises form a coherent political philosophy. Galston's research focuses on Farabi's views of the nature of happiness, the characteristics of ideal rulers, the best kind of government, and the relationship between political theory and theoretical inquiry.

Reception
The book has been reviewed in the Journal of the History of Philosophy and the International Journal of Middle East Studies.

References

External links 
 Politics and Excellence: The Political Philosophy of Alfarabi

1990 non-fiction books
Princeton University Press books
English-language books
Books in political philosophy
Works about Al-Farabi